Duchess Augusta Caroline Friederika Luise of Brunswick-Wolfenbüttel (3 December 1764 – 27 September 1788) was the first wife of Frederick of Württemberg and the mother of William I of Württemberg.

Early life
Princess Augusta was born in Brunswick, the eldest child of Charles William Ferdinand, Duke of Brunswick and Princess Augusta of Great Britain, the elder sister of George III of the United Kingdom. She was named in honour of her mother and grandmother. Augusta was the eldest of seven children, and her younger sister, Princess Caroline, would marry the future George IV of the United Kingdom.

Marriage
On 15 October 1780, at the age of 15, Augusta was married in Brunswick to Duke Frederick of Württemberg, eldest son of Duke Frederick Eugene, himself the youngest brother of the reigning Charles Eugene, Duke of Württemberg. As neither the reigning Duke nor the middle brother had any sons, Frederick's father (and then Frederick himself) was expected to succeed in time as Duke of Württemberg.

That eventuality was however many years in the future, and the birth of a legitimate heir would end Frederick's hopes conclusively. Moreover, his uncle the Duke was not disposed to give any member of his family any role in affairs of government. Frederick was in Prussian employ as Major-general. After the wedding, Augusta followed him to Lüben, a small town in Eastern Prussia, where his regiment was stationed. At that time, the Empress of Russia, Catherine II, and the Austrian Emperor, Joseph II, were forging a new alliance, which would be sealed by a marriage between Elisabeth of Württemberg (younger sister of both Frederick and Maria Feodorovna (Sophie Dorothea of Württemberg), who was married to Tsesarevich Paul, future Emperor of Russia) and Francis, son of the Holy Roman Emperor's brother and successor, Leopold II. The King of Prussia, Frederick II, was opposed to this alliance, which he accused Frederick of supporting. Accordingly, the relations between Frederick and the King soured to the point that Frederick saw himself forced to leave Prussia. Prince Frederick resigned in December 1781, sent Augusta and their baby son William back to Brunswick and joined his sister Maria Feodorovna and her husband on the Italian leg of their extended tour through Europe. While in Naples, in February 1782, Frederick received an invitation from the Russian Empress to move to St Petersburg as Lieutenant-general in her army and Governor-General of Eastern Finland, with his seat at Viipuri. After spending the summer with Augusta in Montbéliard, his parents' home, they finally arrived in St Petersburg in October 1782, where the Empress had renovated and lavishly furnished a mansion for them.

Separation
It was no secret that the marriage between Augusta and Frederick was an unhappy union of two mismatched personalities. Already in the first year of marriage, there was talk of a divorce but Augusta's father absolutely refused, threatening his daughter with social ostracization should she leave her husband. After secret investigations, the Empress discovered that Prince Frederick, whom she would call a 'ferocious rogue', was to blame for the discord. She took it upon herself to protect Augusta, whose conduct she found 'perfectly blameless', from her husband's violent nature. Over the next three years, three more children were born, of which the second daughter, Dorothée, would die at nine months. The relationship between Augusta and her abusive husband deteriorated to the point where Catherine wrote an urgent letter to the Duke of Brunswick that his daughter's life was in danger. When the Duke was hesitant to take action, Catherine urged Augusta to leave her husband and arranged for a police carriage to be on standby at all times. Eventually, on 28 December 1786 (new style), Augusta fled to the Hermitage, where Catherine gave her asylum and ordered Frederick to leave Russia. When Maria Feodorovna protested at this treatment of her brother, Catherine replied curtly, 'It is not I who covers the Prince of Württemberg with shame; instead, I try to cover up his appalling behaviour. It is my duty to suppress such things.' It became known that shortly before Augusta fled, Frederick had plotted (unsuccessfully) to have his wife raped in order to have her reputation dishonoured.

A new life in Estonia and death

While the divorce conditions were being ironed out between Augusta, Frederick, the Empress and Duke Charles, during which time the Empress was on a long journey to the south, Augusta was sent to one of the Imperial estates, Lohde castle, in Lohde (now Koluvere) in Kullamaa Parish to the south-west of Tallinn, Estonia., for her own safety. Because Frederick insisted on having custody of all three children, Augusta refused to sign the divorce papers. Fearing retribution should she return to Brunswick, Augusta accepted Catherine's suggestion to settle in Estonia. Augusta's companions were a gentleman, Major-general Wilhelm von Pohlmann (9 April 1727 – 22 January 1796), and three ladies - Madame Wilde (replaced by Madame Bistram in 1788) and Pohlmann's two daughters. The sixty-year-old Pohlmann, who had retired to his estate near Lohde six years before, had enjoyed an illustrious career at the Russian Court; he was a close and trusted friend of the Empress, who had appointed him to the board of the prestigious Free Economic Society of Russia. From Lodhe, Augusta kept up a regular correspondence with the Empress, who never ceased to care for her, and with her mother, to whom she expressed her satisfaction with the peaceful country life. The Empress sold Augusta's house in St Petersburg on her behalf, advised her to invest the money wisely and allowed her to live off the income from the Lohde estate.

For a few years already, Augusta had been suffering from amenorrhea, for which her doctor had been treating her with potentially dangerous herbal potions, designed to stimulate menstruation. On the morning of 27 September 1788 (new style), at the age of 23, Augusta suddenly experienced violent vaginal bleeding, which continued for six-and-a-half hours, by which time she died. Her doctor had been summoned but due to the long distance, he arrived too late. The Princess's parents received a letter of condolences from the Empress, as well as Pohlmann's report of her death and her doctor's report. Many years later, her eldest son had the matter investigated and her body was exhumed. It was found that, contrary to local rumours, she had neither been buried alive nor with the bones of a baby. Augusta's story was fictionalized by Thackeray in The Luck of Barry Lyndon.

Augusta was buried under the floor of Kullamaa church. On her tombstone is the text: "Hic jacet in pace Augusta Carolina Friderica Luisa Ducis Brunsuicencis-Guelferbytani Filia Friderici Guilielmi Caroli Ducis Vurtembergensis et Supremi Praefecti Viburgiensis Uxor Nat. d. III. Dec. MDCCLXIV Denat. d. XIV. Sept. MDCCLXXXVIII" The date is false - it should have been XVI September. Over the years, her coffin decayed, causing her bones to get lost in the bottom of the deep crypt. Her tombstone is still in the church, albeit in a different position, surrounded by an iron rail.

The castle and lands of Koluvere were afterwards granted to Count Friedrich Wilhelm von Buxhoeveden.

Issue
Augusta and Frederick I of Württemberg had four children:

Prince William of Württemberg (1781–1864), who succeeded his father as King of Württemberg.
Princess Catherine of Württemberg (1783–1835), who married Jérôme Bonaparte, King of Westphalia.
Duchess Sophia Dorothea of Württemberg (1783–1784) died young.
Prince Paul of Württemberg (1785–1852).

Ancestry

References

Sources

External links

Image of the grave stone in the Church of Kullamaa (Goldenbeck), Lääne County, Estonia (in Estonian)

1764 births
1788 deaths
Deaths in childbirth
Duchesses of Brunswick-Lüneburg
Duchesses of Brunswick-Wolfenbüttel
Duchesses of Württemberg
House of Brunswick-Bevern
Nobility from Braunschweig
German expatriates in the Russian Empire
Daughters of monarchs